Călmățui may refer to several places in Romania:

 Călmățui, a village in Grivița Commune, Galați County
 Gura Călmățui, a village in Berteștii de Jos Commune, Brăila County
 Valea Călmățuiului, a village in Însurăței town, Brăila County
 Călmățui (Brăila), a tributary of the Danube in Buzău and Brăila Counties
 Călmățui (Teleorman), a tributary of the Danube in Olt and Teleorman Counties
 Călmățui (Siret), a tributary of the Siret in Galați County

and to:

 Călmățui, Hîncești, a commune in Hîncești district, Moldova